{{Infobox comics creator
| name          = Makoto Tateno
| name_nonEN = 立野 真琴
| image         = 
| image_size    = 
| caption       = 
| alt           = 
| bodyclass     =
| birth_name    = 
| birth_date    = 
| birth_place   = 
| death_date    = 
| death_place   = 
| nationality   = 
| area          =  Manga artist
| cartoonist    = 
| write         = 
| art           = 
| pencil        = 
| ink           = 
| edit          = 
| publish       = 
| letter        = 
| color         = 
| alias         = Shinjuku Tango
| signature     = 
| signature_alt = 
| notable works = Yellow,  Happy Boys'
| collaborators  = 
| awards        =  
| module        = 
| website       =  
| nonUS         = ja
| subcat        = 
}}

, who also uses the pen name Shinjuku Tango, is a Japanese manga artist who made her debut in 1986.  Tateno regards her influences as being Go Nagai and Osamu Tezuka. Two of her best-known works are Yellow and Happy Boys. For the latter, she used the actors from the live-action drama for her character design - among them protagonist Kōji Seto and also Gaku Shindou and Kenta Kamakari as gentlemen hosts. Several of her works have been translated into English, including King of Cards, Hate to Love You, Omen, Red Angel, 9th Sleep, Hero Heel, Ka Shin Fu, Steal Moon, and Yellow''.

Selected works

References

External links 
  
 
 AnimePro special on Makoto Tateno 

Year of birth missing (living people)
Living people
People from Toyama (city)
Manga artists from Toyama Prefecture